The Creanga Mică is a right tributary of the river Târnava Mare, in Romania. It discharges into the Târnava Mare near Vărșag.

References

Rivers of Romania
Rivers of Harghita County